State Power Investment Corporation Limited (abbreviation  SPIC) is one of the five major electricity generation companies in China. It was the successor of China Power Investment Corporation after it was merged with the State Nuclear Power Technology Corporation (SNPTC) in 2015.

SPIC is the parent company of listed companies China Power International Development (known as China Power), Shanghai Electric Power, Yuanda Environmental Protection, etc.

History

In 2015 China Power Investment Corporation (also known as CPI Group) and State Nuclear Power Technology Corporation (abb. SNPTC) merged. Before the deal, they were both directly owned by and majority controlled by the State-owned Assets Supervision and Administration Commission of the State Council respectively. China Power Investment Corporation was the surviving legal person, but renaming to State Power Investment Corporation, while State Nuclear Power Technology Corporation became a subsidiary. SPIC also re-incorporated as a limited company from Industrial Enterprise Owned by the Whole People legal form in 2017. One of the last leader of CPI Group, Li Xiaolin who also chaired in the boards of the listed subsidiary and associate company, such as China Power International Development (also known as China Power) and China Power New Energy Development, was re-appointed by the central government to another state-owned enterprise China Datang Corporation in 2015. Li Xiaolin was one of the key person in the entire history of CPI Group, which was founded in 2003, as well as its predecessor China Power International Holding (also known as CPI Holding), which was founded in 1994. Another leader of former CPI Group, also left the company in 2015. Former chairman of State Nuclear Power Technology Corporation, became the first chairman of SPIC. Previously CPI Group did not have the position of chairman, which the job title of Lu Qizhou was general manager; the former [joint-]deputy general manager of CPI Group, Meng Zhenping, was promoted to general manager. Overall, half of the corporate managers were from former SNPTC and half from CPI Group.

After the merger SPIC had the license to run nuclear power plant in China, as well as the ability to design and build one, making the group had conventional mean on power generation as well as using nuclear fission.

On 28 December 2017 SPIC also recapitalized one of the subsidiary and intermediate holding company China Power Development by issuing non-voting convertible preferred shares to Seth Holdings, making CNIC Corporation the parent company of Seth Holdings, a state-owned enterprise and investment company, could gain significant control on China Power International Development by excise the rights to convert the preferred shares to ordinary share of China Power Development.

Subsidiaries

Equity investments

 China Power Clean Energy Development (28.07% indirectly as the largest shareholder)
 Companhia de Electricidade de Macau (6% via CPI Holding)

References

External links
  

Nuclear power companies of China
Companies based in Beijing
Government-owned companies of China
Energy companies established in 2015
Chinese companies established in 2015
Government-owned energy companies